Brécey is a commune in the Manche department in Normandy in northwestern France. It is located on the crossing of the D999 and D911 roads.

Amenities include a cultural centre and the Collège Pierre Aguiton.

Geography

Climate
Brécey has a oceanic climate (Köppen climate classification Cfb).

Population

Heraldry

See also
Communes of the Manche department

References

Communes of Manche